Arthur William de Brito Savile Foljambe, 2nd Earl of Liverpool,  (27 May 1870 – 15 May 1941), styled Viscount Hawkesbury between 1905 and 1907, was a British Liberal politician, the 16th and last Governor of New Zealand, and the first Governor-General of New Zealand.

Background and education
Born at Compton Place, Eastbourne, Sussex, he was the eldest son and only surviving child of Cecil Foljambe, 1st Earl of Liverpool, by his first wife Louisa Howard, daughter of Frederick John Howard. On his mother's side he descended from Richard Boyle, 3rd Earl of Burlington, the architect. He was educated at Eton College and the Royal Military College, Sandhurst before joining the Rifle Brigade.

Military career
Foljambe was commissioned a second lieutenant in the Rifle Brigade on 2 May 1891, and was promoted to lieutenant on 14 February 1893 and to captain on 1 December 1897. He saw active service in the Second Boer War in South Africa. In July 1901 he was appointed an extra aide-de-camp to the Earl Cadogan, Lord Lieutenant of Ireland. He returned to his regiment in December 1901, joining the 4th battalion stationed in Bloemfontein. He retired from the army in 1907.

Political career
Liverpool succeeded his father in the earldom in 1907 and took his seat in the House of Lords on the Liberal benches. In July 1909 he was appointed Comptroller of the Household in the Liberal administration of H. H. Asquith, a post he held until 1912, when he was appointed Governor of New Zealand. In 1917 the office was raised in rank to that of Governor-General of New Zealand. The same year Liverpool was also admitted to the Privy Council. His term was extended to cover the visit of the Prince of Wales. He retired as governor-general in 1920 and was appointed a Knight Grand Cross of the Order of the Bath on 7 October 1920.

During the First World War, Liverpool conferred his name upon a New Zealand infantry regiment. The New Zealand Rifle Brigade (Earl of Liverpool's Own) was formed in 1915, served with the New Zealand Division during the war and was disbanded in 1919.

Family
Lord Liverpool married Annette Louise Monck, daughter of Henry Monck, 5th Viscount Monck, in 1897. They had no children. In the 1918 New Year Honours, Annette, Countess of Liverpool, was appointed a Dame Grand Cross of the Order of the British Empire. Lord Liverpool owned Hartsholme Hall from 1909 to 1939.

He died at his home Canwick Hall in May 1941, aged 70, and was succeeded in his titles by his half-brother, Gerald Foljambe. The Countess of Liverpool died in May 1948, aged 73.

Arms

References

External links
 

|-

1870 births
1941 deaths
Deputy Lieutenants of Lincolnshire
Governors-General of New Zealand
Knights Grand Cross of the Order of the British Empire
Knights Grand Cross of the Order of St Michael and St George
Knights Grand Cross of the Order of the Bath
Members of the Royal Victorian Order
Members of the Privy Council of the United Kingdom
Arthur
Graduates of the Royal Military College, Sandhurst
Rifle Brigade officers
British Army personnel of the Second Boer War